The Ciolac is a right tributary of the river Bașeu in Romania. It flows into the Bașeu near Hudești.

References

Rivers of Romania
Rivers of Botoșani County
Tributaries of the Bașeu